Collectif Paris-Africa pour l'UNICEF (English: Paris-Africa collective for UNICEF) is first album by group Collectif Paris-Africa formed by UNICEF. It was released in France on 5 December 2011 . The first single called "Des ricochets" was released on 25 October 2011. The profits of the album will go to humanitary aid for the people in Horn of Africa. The album has two discs.

Track listing
Disc 1
"Des ricochets" (several artists) – 3:38
"Elle me dit" (Mika) – 3:39
"La jument de Michao" (Nolwenn Leroy) – 2:56
"Un peu de blues" (Christophe Maé) – 3:32
"Where Them Girls At (feat. Nicki Minaj & Flo Rida)" (David Guetta) – 3:14
"Le jour après la fin du monde" (Corneille) – 3:31
"La danse des magiciens (radio edit)" (Magic System) – 3:51
"Lap Dance" (Ycare) – 3:43
"Celui" (Colonel Reyel) – 3:20
"Je danse" (Jénifer) – 3:12
"Tourne (radio edit)" (Shy'M) – 3:28
"Le même que moi (feat. Léo Rispal)" (Gary Fico) – 3:07
"On avance" (Tal) – 3:09
"Ton héritage" (Benjamin Biolay) – 4:21
"Je partirai" (Anggun) – 4:22
"C'est bientot la fin" (Mozart Opera Rock) – 3:46
"Les jours heureux" (Gerard Lenorman & Shy'M) – 3:46

Disc 2
"Il nous faut" (Elisa Tovati & Tom Dice) – 3:06
"French Cancan" (Inna Modja) – 3:35
"La fée" (Zaz) – 3:21
"Far l'amore (radio edit)" (Bob Sinclar & Raffaella Carrà) – 3:02
"J'aimerais trop" (Keen'v feat. SAP) – 3:45
"A nous actes manqués" (M. Pokora) – 3:45
"Oulala" (Mokobé feat. Yorobo) – 3:41
"Je ne sais pas" (Joyce Jonathan) – 3:19
"Lady Melody" (Tom Frager) – 3:56
"Dis moi" (BB Brunes) – 2:24
"Non non non (ecouter Barbara)" (Camelia Jordana) – 2:41
"Tu ed io pìu lei" (Nico Lilliu) – 3:33
"Le retour à la Terre" (Fatals Picards) – 3:52
"Là où je vais" (Judith) – 2:58
"Sognu" (Amaury Vassili) – 2:55
"Soleil" (Grègoire) – 2:53
"Naître adulte" (Oxmo Puccino) – 4:10

Single "Des ricochets" ("Skimming stones")
List of participants on the single

Alizée
Alpha Blondy
Amaury Vassili
Amel Bent
Anggun
Arielle Dombasle
BB Brunes
Benabar
Bob Sinclar
Chico & The Gypsies
Chimène Badi
Christophe Willem
Claudia
Colonel Reyel
Dave
David Hallyday
Didier Wampas
Elisa Tovati
Fatals Picards
Faudel
Florent Mothe
Gary Fico
Gérard Lenorman
Grégoire
Hélène Ségara
Inna Modja
Jane Birkin
Jenifer
Jérome Van Den Hole
John Mamann
Joyce Jonathan
Judith
Julie Zenatti
Kenza Farah
Lââm
Liane Foly
M. Pokora
Magic System
Manu Katché
Maurane
Melissa Nkonda
Merwan Rim
Mickael Miro
Mikelangelo Loconte
Mimie Mathy
Moïse N’Tumba
Mokobe
Natasha St-Pier
Nicolas Peyrac
Nyco Lilliu
Nolwenn Leroy
Olivier De Benoist
Ophélie Winter
Passi
Patrick Fiori
Peps
Philippe Lavil
Quentin Mosimann
Salvatore Adamo
Shy'm
Sofia Essaidi
Soprano
Tal
Tiken Jah Fakoly
Tina Aréna
VV Brown
Ycare

References

2011 debut albums
Warner Music Group compilation albums